The sablefish (Anoplopoma fimbria) is one of two members of the fish family Anoplopomatidae and the only species in the genus Anoplopoma. In English, common names for it include sable (US), butterfish (US), black cod (US, UK, Canada), blue cod (UK), bluefish (UK), candlefish (UK), coal cod (UK), snowfish (Thailand), coalfish (Canada), beshow, and skil (Canada), although many of these names also refer to other, unrelated, species. The US Food and Drug Administration accepts only "sablefish" as the acceptable market name in the United States; "black cod" is considered a vernacular (regional) name and should not be used as a statement of identity for this species.

Description
The sablefish is a species of deep-sea fish common to the North Pacific Ocean. Adult sablefish are opportunistic feeders, preying on fish, including Alaskan pollock, eulachon, capelin, herring, sandlance, and Pacific cod, as well as squid, euphausiids, and jellyfish. Sablefish are long-lived, with a maximum recorded age of 94 years although the majority of the commercial catch in many areas is less than 20 years old.

Sablefish growth varies regionally, with larger maximum sizes in Alaska, where total lengths up to  weights up to  have been recorded.

Fisheries
Sablefish are typically caught in bottom trawl, longline and pot fisheries. In the Northeast Pacific, sablefish fisheries are managed separately in three areas: Alaska, the Canadian province of British Columbia, and the west coast of the contiguous United States (Washington, Oregon, and California). In all these areas catches peaked in the 1970s and 80s and have been lower since that time due to a combination of reduced populations and management restrictions. The sablefish longline fishery in Alaska has been certified as sustainable by the Marine Stewardship Council as is the US West Coast limited entry groundfish trawl fishery which includes sablefish.

Longline fisheries in Alaska frequently experience predation of sablefish by killer whales and sperm whales which remove the fish from the hooks during the process of retrieving the gear.

Sablefish aquaculture is an area of active research.

As food

The white flesh of the sablefish is soft-textured and mildly flavored. It is considered a delicacy in many countries. When cooked, its flaky texture is similar to Patagonian toothfish (Chilean sea bass). The meat has a high fat content and can be prepared in many ways, including grilling, smoking, or frying, or served as sushi. Sablefish flesh is high in long-chain omega-3 fatty acids, EPA, and DHA. It contains about as much as wild salmon.

Smoked sablefish, often called simply "sable", has long been a staple of New York appetizing stores, one of many smoked fish products usually eaten with bagels for breakfast in American Jewish cuisine.

In Japanese cuisine, the black cod (gindara) is often cooked saikyo yaki style, marinated for several days in sweet white miso or sake lees (kasuzuke) then broiled. The Japanese-Peruvian-American chef Nobu Matsuhisa introduced his version of gindara saikyo yaki at his restaurant in Los Angeles, and brought it to his New York restaurant Nobu in 1994, where it is considered his signature dish, under the name "Black Cod with Miso". Kasuzuke sablefish is popular in Seattle thanks to a large Japanese community in that area.

Mercury content 
Studies of accumulated mercury levels find average mercury concentrations from 0.1 ppm, 0.2 ppm, and up to 0.4 ppm. The US Food and Drug Administration puts sablefish in the "Good Choices" category in their guide for pregnant women and parents, and recommends one 4-ounce serving (uncooked) a week for an adult, less for children. On the other hand, the Alaska epidemiology section considers Alaska sablefish to be "low in mercury" and advises "unrestricted consumption" of sablefish for all populations.

References

External links
 Sablefish on the NOAA FishWatch site
 Canadian Sablefish Association

Anoplopomatidae
Monotypic fish genera
Fish described in 1814
Fish of the Pacific Ocean